Aleksandr Petrovich Kovalyov (born October 12, 1950) is a Russian professional football coach.

Career
Kovalyov managed Russian First League side Lokomotiv Chita. He was president of First Division side Zvezda Irkutsk from 2006 to 2008.

References

External links
 Profile at Footballfacts.ru

1950 births
Living people
Russian football managers